Beatrice Tate School is a coeducational special educational needs (SEN) school for 11-19 year olds.

It opened in 2013, and was designed by Avanti Architects.

It is located in Mile End, East London.

References

External links

Special schools in the London Borough of Tower Hamlets
Mile End
Community schools in the London Borough of Tower Hamlets
Special secondary schools in England